The Wran ministry (1984–1986) or Seventh Wran ministry was the 77th ministry of the New South Wales Government, and was led by the 35th Premier of New South Wales, Neville Wran, representing the Labor Party. It was the seventh of eight consecutive occasions when Wran was Premier.

Background
Wran had been elected to the Legislative Council of New South Wales by a joint sitting of the New South Wales Parliament on 12 March 1970. He was Leader of the Opposition in the Legislative Council from 22 February 1972. He resigned from the council on 19 October 1973 to switch to the Legislative Assembly, successfully contesting the election for Bass Hill, which he would hold until his retirement in 1986. Wran successfully challenged Pat Hills to become Leader of Labor Party and Leader of the Opposition from 3 December 1973 and became Premier following a narrow one seat victory at the 1976 election.

Labor retained government at the 1984 election, despite a 6.95% swing against Labor, losing 11 seats, but retaining a majority of 8 seats in the Legislative Assembly and a single seat majority in the Legislative Council.

Composition of ministry

The ministry covers the period from 5 April 1984 the Wran–led Labor Party was re-elected at the 1984 election. There were four minor rearrangements of the ministry, commencing in November 1984 with the death of Paul Landa, and a second rearrangement in December. The third rearrangement in February 1985 saw the creation of a new portfolio of Ethnic Affairs. The fourth minor rearrangement was caused by the retirement of Eric Bedford and Kevin Stewart in December 1985. The ministry ended on 6 February 1986 when Wran reconfigured his ministry, and the eighth Wran ministry was formed.

 
Ministers are members of the Legislative Assembly unless otherwise noted.

See also

 Members of the New South Wales Legislative Assembly, 1984–1988
 Members of the New South Wales Legislative Council, 1984–1988

Notes

References

 

New South Wales ministries
1984 establishments in Australia
1986 disestablishments in Australia
Australian Labor Party ministries in New South Wales